The Poultry Products Inspection Act of 1957 (P.L. 85–172, as amended) requires the United States Department of Agriculture's Food Safety and Inspection Service (FSIS) to inspect all domesticated birds when slaughtered and processed into products for human consumption. By regulation, FSIS has defined domesticated birds as chickens, turkeys, ducks, geese, and guinea fowl. Ratites were added in 2001. The primary goals of the law are to prevent adulterated or misbranded poultry and products from being sold as food, and to ensure that poultry and poultry products are slaughtered and processed under sanitary conditions. These requirements also apply to products produced and sold within states as well as to imports, which must be inspected under equivalent foreign standards (21 U.S.C. 451 et seq.).

Amendments to 1957 Act
U.S. Congressional amendments to the Poultry Products Inspection Act of 1957.

See also
Amenable species

References

External links
 
 

United States federal agriculture legislation
Poultry farming in the United States